Theaters in Ohio
Playhouse Square Center
Allen Theatre
Hanna Theater
Ohio Theater
Palace Theater
State Theater
Benjamin and Marian Schuster Performing Arts Center
Victoria Theatre
Cleveland Play House
Cleveland Public Theatre
Convergence-Continuum
Dobama Theater
Karamu House
Great Lakes Theater Festival
Raconteur Theatre Company
Theater Ninjas
Murphy Theatre
Valentine Theatre
Stranahan Theater

Ohio culture

Ohio
Theaters